Russula cupreola is an agaricoid fungal species first typed in 1990. It shows a white stem and a purple/ochre coloured cap, with a maximum diameter of 30 mm. The gills will be white in younger fruiting bodies, but as the gills age they will become ochraceous. This species is currently found in Scandinavia.

Merging of species 
Russula cupreola and R. purpureofusca were merged under one name, Russula cupreola, in 2016. The typing of R. purpureofusca was done with a juvenile specimen of R. cupreola, leading mycologists to believe it was a separate species. After noticing similar features between the two species, researchers performed ITS1 sequencing and verified that the two species were conspecific.

References

cupreola